Rogelio Alonso (1906 – death date unknown) was a Cuban outfielder in the Negro leagues between 1927 and 1930. 

A native of Havana, Cuba, Alonso made his Negro leagues debut in 1927 with the Cuban Stars (West), and played with the Stars for four seasons.

References

External links
 and Baseball-Reference Black Baseball Stats and  Seamheads 

1906 births
Date of birth missing
Year of death missing
Place of death missing
Cuban Stars (West) players
Baseball outfielders
Baseball players from Havana